Géza Daruváry de Daruvár (12 January 1866 – 3 August 1934) was a Hungarian politician, who served as Minister of Foreign Affairs between 1922 and 1924. Before the First World War he worked as a consul in several states. István Bethlen appointed him Minister of Justice in 1922. As foreign minister he wanted to make a connection with the Soviet Union (trade and diplomacy), but Daruváry didn't reach any results.

References
 Magyar Életrajzi Lexikon

1866 births
1934 deaths
Foreign ministers of Hungary
Justice ministers of Hungary